Leni Kokkes-Hanepen (born 14 May 1934) is a retired Dutch fencer. She competed in the women's team foil event at the 1960 Summer Olympics.

References

External links
 

1934 births
Living people
Dutch female foil fencers
Olympic fencers of the Netherlands
Fencers at the 1960 Summer Olympics
Fencers from Amsterdam
20th-century Dutch women